The third series of Geordie Shore, a British television programme based in Newcastle upon Tyne, began airing on 26 June 2012 on MTV. The series concluded on 28 August 2012 after 8 episodes and 2 specials including a best bits episode and an episode counting down the top 10 moments from the series. This series is also known as Chaos in Cancun as it is the only series to be filmed in Cancún, Mexico, and it is the last series to feature Jay Gardner until his return in series 6 and Rebecca Walker. This series featured Vicky and Ricci's relationship on the rocks before they finally got engaged, Holly and James growing closer when James breaks his leg, and more bickering and flirting between Gaz and Charlotte.

Cast
 Gaz Beadle
Charlotte-Letitia Crosby
 Holly Hagan
James Tindale
Jay Gardner
Rebecca Walker
Ricci Guarnaccio
Sophie Kasaei
 Vicky Pattison

Duration of cast 

 = Cast member is featured in this episode.
 = Cast member voluntarily leaves the house.
 = Cast member is removed from the house.
 = Cast member returns to the house.
 = Cast member leaves the series.
 = Cast member features in this episode, but is outside of the house.
 = Cast member does not feature in this episode.

Episodes

Ratings

References

2012 British television seasons
Series 03